El Gobernador was a 4-10-0 steam locomotive built by Central Pacific Railroad at the railroad's Sacramento, California shops. It was the last of Central Pacific's locomotives to receive an official name and was also the only locomotive of this wheel arrangement to operate on United States rails. At the time it was built, El Gobernador was the largest railroad locomotive ever built. Its name is reminiscent of the railroad's first locomotive, Gov. Stanford, as El Gobernador is Spanish for The Governor.
This locomotive is a Mastodon type. Confusingly, this was the unofficial name for an earlier engine, "Mastodon" No. 229, the first successful 4-8-0 ever built. Both engines looked nearly identical, except that El Gobernador was longer and had an additional pair of drivers.

Construction and operation 
El Gobernador's construction was completed in February 1883, amid much fanfare from the railroad, but it didn't enter service until March 1884, just over a year later. 
During this time, while still in Sacramento, the gigantic engine was used as an advertising tool by the railroad, to spectacular effect. According to author Guy L. Dunscomb, the engine was kept under steam near the Central Pacific's passenger depot, where it would await the arrival of passenger trains coming in from the east. As the train arrived, El Gobernador would steam past the depot dragging a long line of empty freight cars behind it and causing quite a stir in the process. The engine would then be uncoupled and placed on adjacent trackage, where the passengers could get a good look at the monster up close.

Part of the delay between construction and operation was due to the railroad's track and infrastructure of the time. It was originally designed to haul trains out of California's San Joaquin Valley via Tehachapi Loop. The locomotive was disassembled into five large subassemblies for transportation to the pass because it was thought to be too heavy for the various bridges along the route to the pass.

Operationally, the locomotive did not fare as well as was hoped due to its large cylinder size and small fire grate area (one fireman even commented in anger, "All Hell couldn't keep steam up in that engine!"). During initial shakedown runs around Sacramento, it was found, for example, that the engine's cylinders, which were originally built with innovative rotary valves, were not working properly. This necessitated casting an all-new set of cylinders with conventional slide valves and Stephenson valve gear.
It was during this time that coal was apparently tried as a fuel in an effort to gain better steam economy. Several photographs exist of the locomotive in the Kernville yard, its tender loaded with coal instead the usual cord wood. In the railroad's 1891 renumbering plan, El Gobernador received road number 2050. The rebuild wasn't as successful as the railroad hoped and the locomotive was scrapped on July 15, 1894. After dismantling, the engine's massive boiler was used to provide steam for stationary engines in the railroad shops at Sacramento until scrapped in 1905.

Unfortunately, this engine appears to have largely been a victim of impatience on the part of the road's president, Leland Stanford. A locomotive this size had never been constructed before and proved to be a unique engineering challenge. For example, the engine's frame alone was so large, that it had to be cast in two separate sections instead of all at once as with other locomotives built at Sacramento. As soon as master mechanic A. J. Stevens was able to figure out a part, Stanford would order it built and installed on the new engine, without giving any proper time for testing. Stanford also apparently kept the other members of The Big Four (minus Mark Hopkins, who had died several years before) in the dark about the project as well. Once, while Stanford was away, Charles Crocker came through the locomotive works on a tour of inspection and saw the partially completed El Gobernador under construction. Having not been told about the project, he angrily demanded to know what they were up to. When told by A. J. Stevens that they were attempting to build the largest engine in the world, Crocker ordered all work stopped immediately. Meanwhile, Stanford returned to find that no new work had been done on the engine and when informed of the events that transpired, Crocker's orders were countermanded in no uncertain terms.

References 

 
 Southern Pacific Railway Shops.  Retrieved January 21, 2006.

Further reading

External links 
 Southern Pacific, El Gobernador 4-10-0 Steam Locomotive - includes a side photo of the locomotive

Southern Pacific Railroad locomotives
Individual locomotives of the United States
4-10-0 locomotives
Railway locomotives introduced in 1883
Steam locomotives of the United States
Scrapped locomotives
Freight locomotives
Standard gauge locomotives of the United States